Číčovské mŕtve rameno is a national nature reserve in the Slovak municipalities of Kľúčovec and Číčov in the Dunajská Streda and Komárno District. The nature reserve covers an area of 79.8715 ha of the Danube floodplain area. The protective zone is 55.2553 ha. It has a protection level of 4 and 5 under the Slovak nature protection system. The nature reserve is part of the Dunajské luhy Protected Landscape Area.

Description
The remainder of a dead branch of the Danube river which forms the nature reserve protects various water biotopes, rare waterfowl, aquatic plants and a glacial relict, the tundra vole. The area is significant as an esthetic and research object.

References

Geography of Trnava Region
Geography of Nitra Region
Protected areas of Slovakia